Villaescusa can refer to:

 Villaescusa, Cantabria, Spain
 Villaescusa, Zamora, Spain
 Villaescusa de Haro, Cuenca, Spain
 Villaescusa de Roa, Burgos, Spain
 Villaescusa la Sombría, Burgos, Spain